Alberto Gout (1913–1966) was a Mexican screenwriter, producer and film director.

Selected filmography
 Saint Francis of Assisi (1944)
 Smoke in the Eyes (1946)
 The Well-paid (1948)
 Revenge (1948)
 Courtesan (1948)
 Aventurera (1950)
 Sensualidad (1951)
 En carne viva (1951)
 Sacrificed Women (1952)
 Aventura en Río (1953)
 I Want to Live (1953)
 La sospechosa (1955)
 The Rape of the Sabine Women (1962)

References

Bibliography
 Daniel Biltereyst &  Daniela Treveri Gennari. Moralizing Cinema: Film, Catholicism, and Power. Routledge, 2014.

External links

1913 births
1966 deaths
Mexican film producers
Writers from Mexico City
Film directors from Mexico City
20th-century Mexican screenwriters
20th-century Mexican male writers